N. Gouzagin (1933 – 2004) was an Indian politician. He was a Member of Parliament, representing Outer Manipur in the Lok Sabha the lower house of India's Parliament.

References

External links
  Official biographical sketch in Parliament of India website

Lok Sabha members from Manipur
Indian National Congress politicians
India MPs 1971–1977
India MPs 1980–1984
1933 births
2004 deaths